Grapeshot is a type of anti-personnel ammunition used in cannons.

Grapeshot may also refer to:
 Grape Shot (shipwreck), off the coast of Plum Island, Wisconsin, United States
 Operation Grapeshot, the final Allied attack during the Italian Campaign of the Second World War
 Whiff of grapeshot
 Grapeshot, a British developer of contextual targeting solutions, acquired by Oracle Corporation in 2018